Richard Kwesi Nathan (born 18 May 1993) is a Ghanaian professional footballer who plays as a forward for Ghanaian Premier League side Aduana Stars.

Career 
Nathan joined Aduana Stars in July 2019 ahead of the 2019–20 Ghana Premier League. He made his debut on 5 January 2020, coming on in the 72nd minute for Noah Martey to score his debut goal as well in the 93rd minute of injury time to hand Aduana a 1–0 victory over Accra Great Olympics. The league was however cancelled as a result of the COVID-19 pandemic in June 2020. Before its cancellation, he had made 5 league appearances and scored a goal. He made the squad for the 2020–21 season as the league was set to restart in November 2020.

References

External links 

 
 

Living people
1993 births
Association football forwards
Ghanaian footballers
Aduana Stars F.C. players
Ghana Premier League players